Guapiaçu is a municipality in the state of São Paulo, Brazil, with a population, measured in 2020 by the IBGE, of 21,775 and an area of . Is located in the north/northwest of the state,  from São José do Rio Preto.

The city name comes from the Tupi language, and means "Big spring (of a river)".

History

The settlement of the region began at the end of the 19th century. At the beginning of the 20th century, the city was a village named Ribeirão Claro.  On 28 November 1927 the village was elevated to a district. The name changed to its current form in 1945. The city was established as a municipality on 30 November 1953, when it was separated from Rio Preto.

Demographics

Indicators

Population: 17,869 (IBGE/2010)
Area: 
Population density: 54.8/km² (2,451.5/sq mi)
Urbanization: 88.4% (2010)
Birth rate: 11.59/1,000 inhabitants (2009)
Infant mortality: 9.9/1,000 births (2009)
Literacy rate: 90.26 (2000)
HDI: 0.817 (UNDP/2000)

All indicators are from SEADE and IBGE.

Economy

Manufacturing is the economic basis of Guapiaçu, producing 53.2% of the city's GDP. The tertiary sector provides 39.4% of GDP, and the primary sector 7.3%.

Transportation

 SP-425 "Rodovia Assis Chateaubriand",  to São José do Rio Preto
 Estrada Vicinal (Vicinal road) to Cedral

References

Municipalities in São Paulo (state)